Ian C. Thomas (born 1963), a.k.a. Ian T., is a long-term Australian comics artist, cartoonist, and musician.  He created Australia's first minicomic (in 1978), produced Maelstrom (1982) and contributed to the early Australian anthology Reverie, as well as a comic strip about a busker in Melbourne newspaper City Extra.

Ian T's recent work has appeared widely in Australian comics, including OzTAKU (Moth & Tanuki black-and-white series), The Ink music comic, Xuan Xuan, Pirates, Tango, literary journal Going Down Swinging, and the books Operation Funnybone, and Beginnings (2012).  Among other comics, he drew Dillon Naylor's Rock 'N' Roll Fairies for Total Girl magazine (Sept. 2005-Aug. 2006) and a Moth & Tanuki color series for Mania magazine (Jan.-Summer 2007).

He is a professional member of the Australian Cartoonists' Association .

Ian T is also the musical artist known as Busker's Dog, named after a character in the earlier comic strip.  First album "Sea to City" was released in 2022.  It features guests including  Tom Haran and Peter Lacey, and was mastered by  Scott Hull at Masterdisk.

References
 Bonzer: Australian comics 1900-1990s edited by Annette Shiell; checklist compiled by Mick Stone. Redhill South, Vic.: Elgua Media, 1998.  / 1876677066
 Operation Funnybone edited by Glen Shearer.  Melbourne, Vic.: Operation Funnybone, 2005. 
 The Tango Collection edited by Bernard Caleo.  Crows Nest, N.S.W.: Allen & Unwin, 2009. 
 Beginnings: a comics anthology edited by Emma-Jean Stewart.  Canberra, A.C.T.: ACT Comic Meet, 2012. 
 Australia: a collection of Australian comic stories to benefit beyondblue edited by Nat Karmichael. Margate Beach, Qld.: Comicoz, 2015.

External links
Ian C. Thomas ACA page

Australian comics artists
Australian cartoonists
1963 births
Living people